At least two vessels of the Royal Navy have borne the name, HMS Crash.

  was a 12-gun  launched in 1797 and broken up in 1802.
  was renamed HMS Crash in 1803 and broken up that same year.

Royal Navy ship names